Holland Road Halt was a railway station in Hove, East Sussex, which opened in 1905 and closed in 1956. It lay to the west of the original Hove station (1840–1880) and to the east of the current station of that name (1865–present) as well as the Cliftonville Curve. It was mainly used during rush hours by stopping trains to Worthing.

History
The station had the status of a halt and opened on 3 September 1905 on the west side of the bridge carrying Holland Road over the West Coastway Line. Other halts were opened at Dyke Junction, Bungalow Town and Ham Bridge. Services commenced on 3 September 1905 and the single-coach units were successful in raising traffic figures.

Holland Road Halt was situated just west of the overbridge at the west end of Holland Road goods yard which closed on 14 June 1971. The site of the station corresponded roughly to that of the original Hove station which closed in 1880. The halt was built with timber platforms, which it retained until its closure, and also had wooden steps from the overbridge to the platforms. In February 1956, British Railways proposed closing the station because passenger numbers were low, and the last day of service was 7 May 1956.

References

External links

My Brighton and Hove - Holland Road Halt

Disused railway stations in Brighton and Hove
Railway stations in Great Britain opened in 1905
Railway stations in Great Britain closed in 1956
Former London, Brighton and South Coast Railway stations